The Minicar RSV was a concept automobile created in the United States and funded by the National Highway Traffic Safety Administration (NHTSA) to find ways to decrease highway fatalities. A contract was awarded in 1975 to independent firms Calspan & Minicars, after rejecting unsuitable concepts presented by much larger automakers, including Ford and Volkswagen. The car itself was completed sometime between 1976 & 1980: at least 10 were produced & demonstrated on television & at county fairs. The program was terminated in January 1981, at the start of the Reagan Administration, and most of the test vehicles were destroyed by 1991. In the late 2000s, two vehicles were found, and NHTSA paid to bring one to semi-usable status for further study.

Specifications 
 Doors: 2 gull wing
 Features: airbags; run-flat tires; did NOT have seat belts in the front
 Frame: plastic-composite and steel mix
 Mileage: 32mpg est.
 Powerplant: Honda EF
 Seating: 4 passengers

References

External links 
"How the U.S. Government Killed the Safest Car Ever Built" on Jalopnik
Reddit Thread on Jalopnik article
Production and testing of RSV mini cars in the United States (purchasable video)

Concept cars
Automotive safety